Sampo Group is a significant Nordic insurance group made up of the parent company Sampo plc, P&C Insurance Holding Ltd, Mandatum Holding Ltd, Danish insurer Topdanmark and British P&C insurer Hastings, all of which are its subsidiaries. The parent company in Helsinki administers the subsidiaries. Sampo Group employs over 13,500 employees. Torbjörn Magnusson is the Group CEO and President of Sampo Group.

Largest shareholders of Sampo plc are Finnish national institutions (Government of Finland and State Pension Fund) as well as Varma Mutual Pension Insurance Company, Ilmarinen Mutual Pension Insurance Company, Sampo plc itself and Elo Mutual Pension Insurance Company.

Sampo Group had a banking operations under the name of Sampo Bank between 2000 and 2006. In November 2006, it was disclosed that the banking business of Sampo was sold to the Danish Danske Bank so that Sampo could concentrate on its insurance business. The proceeds of the sale were invested in the shares of Nordea, the largest bank in the Nordic region. Sampo sold its entire holding in Nordea in April 2022. 

If is the leading property and casualty insurer in the Nordic region, with more than 3.7 million customers in the Nordic and Baltic countries. If offers insurance and services in Finland, Sweden, Norway, Denmark, Estonia, Latvia and Lithuania.

Sustainability 
In 2017, Sampo plc published the first group-level sustainability report. In 2019, the Group joined the UN Global Compact initiative and signed the UN PRI. In addition to the group-level sustainability reporting, each individual Sampo Group company publishes their own sustainability reports annually.

History 
The story of Sampo began in 1909, when the Mutual Insurance Company Sampo was established in Turku, Finland.

The 1980s were a turning point in Sampo's history. In 1987, Sampo changed its company type from a mutual insurance company to a limited company. The company's insurance customers became shareholders, and Sampo was listed on the Helsinki Stock Exchange in January 1988.

The merger of Sampo and state-owned Leonia Bank was the number one business news story at the turn of the millennium. Sampo's Annual General Meeting approved the merger in April 2000. The Finnish state became the largest owner of Sampo-Leonia.

Leonia Bank became Sampo Bank in February 2001, and Investment Bank Mandatum joined Sampo Group later that spring. In 2002, Sampo became a shareholder in the Nordic insurance company P&C.

In 2006, Sampo announced a divestment that went down in Finnish economic history.

Nowadays, Sampo Group consists of the parent company Sampo plc and the subsidiaries: If, Topdanmark, Hastings, and Mandatum. Through its subsidiaries, Sampo Group operates in: Finland, Sweden, Norway, Denmark, Baltic countries, and Great Britain.

Shareholders
Sampo plc's A share has been listed on NASDAQ OMX Helsinki (former Helsinki Stock Exchange) since January 1988. In terms of market capitalization Sampo plc is one of the largest companies listed on NASDAQ OMX Helsinki.

Foreign and nominee registered owners had 61.41% of Sampo plc's shares (31 Jan 2023). At the end of 2022, Sampo plc had over 198,000 shareholders.

Mandatum 

Mandatum is one of Finland's most respected and solvent financial services providers and part of the Sampo Group. They provide their customers with a variety of services, including wealth management, investments, personal risk insurance as well as incentive and reward solutions. 

Mandatum has achieved the highest ranking ever by a Finnish company as one of the best workplaces in Europe, reaching top ten in the large companies category. In 2020 and 2021, Mandatum was selected as the number one place to work in Finland in the large companies category of the Great Place to Work Institute's survey. Mandatum.

Mandatum Group consists of two business areas: Mandatum Life Insurance Company Ltd (Mandatum Life) offers life insurance services and Mandatum Asset Management Ltd asset management services. The parent company of the group is Mandatum Holding Ltd. Sampo PLC owns the entire stock of the Mandatum Holding Ltd.

Nordea

Nordea Bank Abp, commonly referred to as Nordea, is a Nordic financial services group operating in Northern Europe. In October 2009, Sampo plc received permission from Swedish authorities to acquire more than 20% of Nordea. Sampo sold its entire holding in Nordea in April 2022.

Name

In Finnish mythology, the name "Sampo" refers to a mythical machine that creates salt, food, flour and gold out of nothing.

See also
List of Finnish companies
 If P&C Insurance

References

Companies based in Helsinki
Companies listed on Nasdaq Helsinki
Former mutual insurance companies
Financial services companies of Finland
Financial services companies established in 1909
Finnish brands
1909 establishments in Finland